The Manhattan address algorithm refers to the formulas used to estimate the closest east–west cross street for building numbers on north–south avenues in the New York City borough of Manhattan.

Algorithm
To find the approximate number of the closest cross street, divide the building number by a divisor (generally 20) and add (or subtract) the "tricky number" from the table below:

See also
 List of numbered streets in Manhattan
 Numbered street

References

!
Algorithms